The Konya Blue Train, previously referred to as the Mevlana Express is an overnight intercity train operating between İzmir and Konya since 16 August 2012. The inaugural train will departed Alsancak Terminal in İzmir at 8:00pm (EEST) after an opening ceremony which the minister of transport, Binali Yıldırım will attend. The train follows the former Smyrna Cassaba Railway's mainline to Afyon passing through Manisa, Alaşehir, Uşak, Afyon and Konya. The Konya Blue Train is the first train service to operate east of Uşak, to Afyon, since the cancellation of the İzmir-Diyarbakır Postal Train several years ago.

Consists

DE 22 000, Head End Power Car, Coach, Coach, Coach, Coach, Diner, sleeper

References

External links
 Konya Mavi Treni

Named passenger trains of Turkey
Railway services introduced in 2012
2012 establishments in Turkey